Hockey East is an NCAA Division I ice hockey-only conference based in Wakefield, Massachusetts that was formed in 1984 after five Eastern College Athletic Conference teams decided to create their own league over scheduling concerns. At the completion of each regular season, it holds the Hockey East Men's Ice Hockey Tournament to determine its conference champion. Beginning in 1988, the winner of the conference tournament has been awarded the Lamoriello Trophy, named after the first commissioner of Hockey East, Lou Lamoriello.

The tournament was first hosted at the Providence Civic Center (now called the Amica Mutual Pavilion) in Providence, Rhode Island with Providence winning the inaugural tournament. Boston College has won the most Hockey East Men's Ice Hockey Tournaments with eleven and has the most championship game appearances with sixteen. Jerry York has coached nine championship teams and has the most championship game appearances with eleven. Shawn Walsh has made the most consecutive championship appearances with seven (1987–1993).

The TD Garden (formerly the FleetCenter) has hosted the tournament since 1996. The Boston Garden hosted the tournament seven times, while the Providence Civic Center and Kelley Rink each hosted the tournament twice. In 2021, the Mullins Center served as host for the championship game, as all tournament games were held on campus locations due to the COVID-19 pandemic. Massachusetts earned the right to host the title game as the higher seed of the two semifinal winners. 

2016 was the first Championship in which at least one of the "Big 4" schools (Boston College, Boston University, Maine, New Hampshire) did not play in the title game.

Champions

Championships by School

References
General

Specific

External links
Hockey East tournament history

College ice hockey in the United States lists